Cullman Regional Airport-Folsom Field  is a public-use airport located five nautical miles (6 mi, 9 km) north of the central business district of Cullman, a city in Cullman County, Alabama, United States. It is owned by the City and County of Cullman.

This airport is included in the Federal Aviation Administration's National Plan of Integrated Airport Systems for 2011–2015 and 2009–2013, both of which are categorized as a general aviation airport.

Facilities and aircraft 
Folsom Field covers an area of 90 acres (36 ha) at an elevation of 969 feet (295 m) above mean sea level. It has one runway designated 2/20 with an asphalt surface measuring 5,500 by 100 feet (1,676 x 30 m).

For the 12-month period ending July 28, 2010, the airport had 37,830 aircraft operations, an average of 103 per day: 99.7% general aviation and 0.3% military.
At that time there were 57 aircraft based at this airport: 86% single-engine, 5% multi-engine and 9% helicopter.

Skydive Alabama 
Skydive Alabama (SA), a civilian skydiving center, is operated out of Folsom Field. SA is a United States Parachute Association (USPA)-affiliated drop zone that operates year-round, maintaining a Beech 99. Most skydives take place from an altitude of around 14,000 feet, but high altitude jumps from 18,000 feet are commonly made with the use of supplemental oxygen.

Accidents and incidents
On 23 November 1982, popular Southern Baptist religious humorist, television personality and author Grady Nutt and two pilots with air charter operator Central American Inter'l Inc. were killed in the near-vertical crash of a Beechcraft Baron 95-B55, registration number N18411, shortly after takeoff under nighttime instrument meteorological conditions (IMC). The National Transportation Safety Board (NTSB) was unable to conclusively determine the cause of the crash, but bad weather and poor visibility were thought to be contributing factors.
The NTSB attributed the accident to the pilot's failure to initiate a missed approach, his failure to maintain altitude, his lack of recent instrument flying experience, and his history of heart problems; contributing factors were poor visibility and adverse weather.
The NTSB attributed the accident to the pilot's failure to correctly execute the missed approach procedure; a contributing factor was the lack of fixed-wing flight experience by the pilot, whose previous flying had almost exclusively been conducted in military rotorcraft.
On 5 January 2020, an amateur-built Van's Aircraft RV-6, registration number N420PW, crashed on the field in a left spin during an apparent attempt to return to the airport after an engine failure on takeoff. Two people, the pilot and passenger on board, were killed. The accident is under investigation by the NTSB.
On 20 February 2021, a Piper PA-32 crashed near the airport, killing one occupant and severely injuring the other. Four days later, the second aircraft occupant died from injuries sustained in the crash. NTSB investigators confirmed that one of the occupants reported the aircraft had lost power before the accident.

References

External links 
 Cullman Airport - Folsom Field at Cullman County website
 Skydive Alabama
 Aerial image as of March 1997 from USGS The National Map
 
 

Airports in Alabama
Transportation buildings and structures in Cullman County, Alabama